The 1995 Sandown ATCC round was the opening round of the 1995 Australian Touring Car Championship. It was held on the weekend of 3 to 5 February at Sandown Raceway in Melbourne, Victoria. It consisted of two 28-lap races and the "Dash for Cash" - a 3-lap sprint for the fastest 10 qualifiers, starting positions for the "dash" were drawn at random. Pole was taken by John Bowe and the overall round was won by Larry Perkins.

Background
In pre-season testing, defending champion Mark Skaife sustained injuries which forced him out of the opening round. Gibson Motorsport made no effort to replace Skaife for this round, instead leaving Jim Richards as the sole Gibson Motorsport competitor on the grid for the weekend.

Race results

Qualifying

Dash for Cash

Race 1

Race 2

Championship standings after the event
 After Round 1 of 10. Only the top five positions are included.

Drivers' Championship standings

External links

References

1995 in Australian motorsport
Sandown